Wojtek Urbanski is a Polish composer, music producer and arranger. Winner of the Fryderyk 2022 (the most important Polish phonographic award - the Polish equivalent of the Grammy Award) for the album RYSY - "4GET". Winner of the Polish Soundtrack of The Year 2022 award at the Film Music Festival 2022 for his music for the Netflix movie "Hyacinth". Music director of the concert "Together With Ukraine" broadcast in March 2022 in dozens of countries around the world as a gesture of solidarity with Ukraine. Author of music for the Silesian exposition at the Polish EXPO Pavilion in Dubai. Creator of film music, constantly cooperating with the Netflix platform. His songs have repeatedly reached double platinum status. The songs "Ostatni", "Oczko w głowie" and "Zabierz tę miłość", which he produced and co-composed, have exceeded 20 million plays each. 

He created music for the series "Ultraviolet" (directed by Jan Komasa), "Rysa", "Układ" and the film "Operation Hyacinth" (directed by Piotr Domalewski), among others. 

He's the author of music for the virtual metaverse world Everdome.

Discography

Albums

Awards

References 

Year of birth missing (living people)
Living people
Polish composers